Mahanadhi-Sakotharigalin Kadhai is an 2023 Indian Tamil-language drama television series starring Kamuruddin, Prathipa, Lakshmi Priya, Rudran Praveen, Saravanan and Sujatha Sivakumar. It is produced by Praveen Bennett under the banner of Global Villagers. It premiered on Star Vijay in 23 January 2023 From Monday - Friday at 22:00 and is also available on the digital platform Disney+ Hotstar. This series was launched along with Siragadikka Aasai.

Synopsis
The series depicts the story of four sisters around a family, who lost their father and tries to rise up in society.

Cast

Main 
 Prathiba as Ganga (Eldest daughter in the family, Kumaran's love interest, Main female lead)
 Kamuruddin as Kumaran (Ganga's Cousin, Main Male lead)
 Lakshmi Priya as Kaveri (Ganga's youngest sister, Nivin's love interest)
 Rudran Praveen as Nivin

Supporting 
 Saravanan as Santhanam (Deceased) 
 Sujatha Sivakumar as Saradha
 Aadhirai Soundararajan as Yamuna
 Baby Kaavya as Narmadha
 Sumi Santhosh
 Sanjay Mohan
 Vishwa Mithran

Production

Development 
The shooting of this serial commenced in Ende December 2022. The first promo was released on 7 January 2023. The series promotion was in Bigg Boss 6 house on 16 January.

Casting
Lakshmi Priya and prathiba were cast in the female lead roles as Kaveri and Ganga. Kamuruddin and Newcomer Rudran Praveen portrayed male lead roles as Kumaran and Neevin. While Saravanan and Sujatha Sivakumar were also selected for supporting roles.

References

External links
 Mahanadhi at Disney+ Hotstar

Star Vijay original programming
2023 Tamil-language television series debuts
Tamil-language television shows
Tamil-language melodrama television series
Television shows set in Tamil Nadu